Rotoa is a genus of moths of the family Noctuidae.

Species
 Rotoa distincta (Bang-Haas, 1912)

References
Natural History Museum Lepidoptera genus database
Rotoa at funet

Hadeninae